The Last Thing He Told Me is an upcoming thriller television miniseries for Apple TV+, based on the novel of the same name by Laura Dave. The miniseries is created by Dave and Josh Singer and is set to star Jennifer Garner. It is set to premiere on April 14, 2023.

Premise
Hannah forms an unexpected relationship with her stepdaughter as she searches for her husband who recently disappeared.

Cast and characters
 Jennifer Garner as Hannah
 Angourie Rice as Bailey
 Nikolaj Coster-Waldau as Owen
 Aisha Tyler as Jules
 Geoff Stults as Jake
 John Harlan Kim as Bobby
 Augusto Aguilera as Grady

Episodes

Production

Development
Ahead of the May 4, 2021 release of the novel, it was optioned by Hello Sunshine and Red Om Films. Soon after, in partnership with 20th Television, Hello Sunshine and Red Om Films put the project on the marketplace, when Apple, in a highly competitive bidding war, won the project and gave it a straight-to-series order. Laura Dave, author of the novel, will write the adapted screenplay with her husband Josh Singer. Olivia Newman is set to direct the series pilot, with Deniz Gamze Ergüven, Daisy Von Scherler Mayer, and Lila Neugebauer directing the other episodes.

Casting
In January 2021, Julia Roberts was announced in a lead role for The Last Thing He Told Me. In November 2021, Jennifer Garner replaced Roberts as star and producer. Angourie Rice was added to the cast in April 2022, with Nikolaj Coster-Waldau, Aisha Tyler, Geoff Stults, John Harlan Kim and Augusto Aguilera joining in May.

Filming
Filming for the series began on May 3, 2022.

Release
The Last Thing He Told Me scheduled to premiere on April 14, 2023, with the first two episodes available immediately and the rest debuting on a weekly basis until May 19.

References

External links
 

2020s American television miniseries

English-language television shows
Apple TV+ original programming
Upcoming television series
American thriller television series
Television series based on American novels
Television series by 20th Century Fox Television